Anthony John Goldbloom (born 21 June 1983) is the founder and CEO of Kaggle, a data science competition platform which has used predictive modelling competitions to solve problems for NASA, Wikipedia, Ford and Deloitte. Kaggle has improved the state of the art across a range of fields, including mapping dark matter  and HIV/AIDS research. Kaggle has received considerable media attention since it first launched in February 2010, particularly following news that it had received $11.25 million in Series A funding from a round led by Khosla Ventures and Index Ventures. Goldbloom has been cited by Forbes Magazine as one of the 30 Under 30 in Technology, profiled by Fast Company as part of its 'Who's Next?' series and by the Sydney Morning Herald. Goldbloom has been quoted in the New York Times, the Wall Street Journal, the Independent and has appeared on the Science Show Catalyst. In 2021, he joined AIX Ventures as an Investment Partner. AIX Ventures is a venture capital fund that invests in artificial intelligence startups.

Background 
Goldbloom was born in Melbourne, Australia, and holds a first-class honours degree in Economics and Econometrics from the University of Melbourne. During high school, Goldbloom represented Australia in sailing, notably competing in the 2001 World Championships in Sydney in the 29er class. A trained economist, Goldbloom began his career working in the economic modeling unit of Australia's Department of Treasury and later spent time in the Research department at the Reserve Bank of Australia. He conceived of the idea behind Kaggle while working as an intern at The Economist in London, when he was asked to write an article on the emerging area of "big data". On 8 March 2017, Google announced that they were acquiring Kaggle. Goldbloom now reports to the Google organization.

Goldbloom lives with his wife in San Francisco, California, where Kaggle is now headquartered.

References

External links 
 

1983 births
Living people
Australian businesspeople
University of Melbourne alumni
People from Melbourne
Australian Jews